CU or cu, may refer to:

 Close-up, in film making
 Cuba (ISO 3166, FIPS Pub 10-4 and obsolete NATO digram)
 .cu, Cuba's top-level domain country code
 Old Church Slavonic (ISO 639 alpha-2 language code)
 "See you", in e-mail shorthand
 Cubit, ancient unit of length

Businesses and organizations 
CU (store), a chain of South Korean convenience stores
Customs union, a type of intergovernmental trade bloc
ChristianUnion, a political party in the Netherlands
Christian Union (students), a university or college student Christian group
Consumers Union, a non-profit organization based in the United States
Credit union, a member-owned financial cooperative
Cubana de Aviación (IATA airline designator CU)

Science, technology, and mathematics 
 Copper, symbol Cu, a chemical element
 CU (power line), running between North Dakota and Minnesota, US
 cu (Unix utility), a remote login command 
 Callous and unemotional traits, in psychology
 Cellulase Unit, an enzyme measurement
 Control unit (disambiguation)
 ".cu", the filename extension for CUDA objects
 chemical formula of Uranium carbide

Universities

Africa
Cairo University, Egypt
Covenant University, Nigeria

Asia
Chandigarh University, India
Chang'an University, Xi'an, Shaanxi, China
Chitkara University, Punjab, India
Chittagong University, Bangladesh
Chongqing University, China
Christ University, India
Chulalongkorn University, Thailand
University of Calcutta, India

Australia
Curtin University, Australia

Europe
University of Cambridge, UK
Cardiff University, UK
Catholic University of Eichstätt-Ingolstadt, Germany
Charles University, Prague, Czech Republic
Cranfield University, UK
Coventry University, UK

North America
Cheyney University of Pennsylvania, US
Cameron University, Oklahoma, US
Carleton University, Ottawa, Canada
Cedarville University, Ohio, US
Chapman University, California, US
Ciudad Universitaria, the main campus of the National University of Mexico
Clarkson University, New York, US
Clemson University, South Carolina, US
Colgate University, New York, US
Columbia University, New York, US
Concordia University (Montreal), Canada
Cooper Union, New York, US
Cornell University, New York, US
Cornerstone University, Michigan, US
Creighton University, Nebraska, US
University of Colorado, US
University of Colorado Boulder (cf. Colorado Buffaloes, this school's athletic program)